Ayutthaya A.T.C.C was a female professional volleyball team based in Phranakhon Si Ayutthaya, Thailand.

History
Ayutthaya A.T.C.C was a women's volleyball club, based in Phranakhon Si Ayutthaya, Thailand. It included volleyball teams for females of all ages, children through adult. The club played in Volleyball Thailand League.

In 2014, Ayutthaya A.T.C.C won the 2014 Volleyball Thai-Denmark Super League, defeating 3-0 the Idea Khonkaen in the semifinals and 3-0 to the Nakhon Ratchasima in the final.

Previous names

Honours
 Thailand League 
  Champion (1): 2009–10
  Runner-up (3): 2008–09, 2010–11, 2014–15
  Third (1): 2013–14
 Thai-Denmark Super League 
  Champion (1): 2014
  Third (2): 2013, 2015

Former squad

Notable players

Domestic Players

  Somruk Sungpokeaw
  Patcharee Sangmuang
  Rattanaporn Sanuanram
  Yupa Sanitklang
  Anongporn Promrat
  Siriporn Sooksen
  Nisachon Pawong
  Chatchu-on Moksri
  Kannika Sitthipat
  Soraya Phomla
  Kannika Thipachot
  Yaowalak Maha-an
  Surasawadee Boonyuen

Foreigner Players

  Yelena Parkhomenko
  Nia Grant
  Nguyen Thi Ngoc Hoa

References

Volleyball clubs in Thailand
2010 establishments in Thailand
2015 disestablishments in Thailand
Sports clubs disestablished in 2015